Lars Boven (born 13 August 2001) is a Dutch professional racing cyclist, who currently rides for UCI Continental team .

Major results

2018
 1st Stage 1 (TTT) Tour du Pays de Vaud
2019
 1st  Time trial, National Junior Road Championships
 2nd  Time trial, UEC European Junior Road Championships
 2nd Overall Tour du Pays de Vaud
 2nd Classique des Alpes
 3rd Paris–Roubaix Juniors
 4th EPZ Omloop van Borsele
 7th Time trial, UCI Junior Road World Championships
2020
 1st Stage 3 Bałtyk–Karkonosze Tour
2021
 1st Prologue Istrian Spring Trophy
 1st Prologue (TTT) Tour Alsace
 4th Time trial, National Under-23 Road Championships
 7th Overall Flanders Tomorrow Tour
2022
 1st  Overall Flanders Tomorrow Tour
1st  Points classification
1st Stage 2
 1st Stage 2a (TTT), Ronde de l'Isard
 2nd  Mixed Team relay, UEC European Under–23 Road Championships
 6th Gran Premio di Poggiana
 8th Overall Tour Alsace
 9th Time trial, National Under-23 Road Championships

Notes

References

External links

2001 births
Living people
Dutch male cyclists
21st-century Dutch people